The Kamariny Stadium was opened by the Queen Elizabeth II of the United Kingdom in 1958.  A plaque stands a few metres from the track that once bore her name. It is a public cinder track built to a British standard where four laps measures one imperial mile.

The stadium is 2 km outside the town of Iten, the capital of Elgeyo-Marakwet County, in Kenya.

Athletics (track and field) venues in Kenya
Elgeyo-Marakwet County